Lee Rock II is a 1991 Hong Kong crime drama film directed by Lawrence Ah Mon and starring Andy Lau, Sharla Cheung, Aaron Kwok and Chingmy Yau. The film is a direct sequel to Lee Rock released earlier in the same year, which is inspired by a true story of real life corrupt police officer Lui Lok, who is portrayed in the film as Lee Rock by Lau.

Plot
The film continues directly from Lee Rock, with a brief recap of the main details of its predecessor.

In 1959, Yau Ma Tei foreign detective Reeve retires, which leads to a competition between Lee Rock and Ngan Tung for the position as Yau Ma Tei's chief detective. Ngan Tung does not hesitate to collude with many of Hong Kong's businessmen and drug dealers in hopes of taking the throne. Lee Rock also refuses to back down and pleases to Commissioner's wife, while the Commissioner also highly regards Lee. Although ultimately Ngan Tung gets the position as the chief detective of Yau Ma Tei, Lee Rock was also promoted as the Chief Chinese Detective, a newly created post, which puts Lee ahead of Ngan. After Lee takes office, he reforms the procedures of each department, gaining support from many businessmen and his momentum appears rises. As contrast to Ngan Tung, who standing plummeted, which makes his hatred toward Lee stronger. Therefore, he got King Crab's henchman to assassinate Lee, which Lee escaped unharmed. To avoid having Lee find out that he was the mastermind behind the assassination, Ngan kills Crab.

During the 1960s, Lee Rock's power is monstrous, not only does he control the entire Hong Kong Police Force's operations, but also actively invests in commercial real estate, entertainment and many other fields. He becomes a major figure with an estimated wealth of HK$500 million.

In 1972 Britain sent Sutcliffe to Hong Kong to be the new Commissioner of Police. He finds the Hong Kong Police Force to be extremely corrupt, making the entire community a big hotbed of crime, and he is determined to actively combat all criminal activities. This makes life difficult for Lee and everyone else. In 1974, the ICAC was established and is committed to combating all forms of corruption, which leads to Lee Rock's idea of early retirement. Lee decides to transfer all of its assets to Canada and migrating there with his family.

In the aspect of his family, Rose's arrival to Hong Kong coincides with the time polygamy was being abolished in Hong Kong. In order to avoid being the third party between Lee and his wife Grace, she chooses to bring their son Bill Lee away, and settled in Australia. Rose works hard to raise Bill, and they come back to Hong Kong after Bill grows up. Bill also became a staff member of the ICAC. Bill learned about his father's crimes, which causes strong hatred towards his father. The conflict between the father and son causes Rose to fall ill and be hospitalized. When Lee Rock learns that Rose is dying, he rushes to the hospital but was being hunted at the same time. It was King Crab's younger brother from Netherlands, who came to avenge his brother when he believed Ngan who told him that Lee killed Crab. Lee suffers from a gunshot wound and witnessed Rose's death at the hospital. The killers also arrived at that time and Lee Rock and his son work together to kill off the killers, which also improves the relationship between the father and son.

In the end, a lot of corruption is still happening in Hong Kong, especially in the police force where various police officers have been arrested by the ICAC and treated by the law; while the wanted Lee Rock enjoys a stable life with his family in Canada.

Cast
Andy Lau as Lee Rock
Sharla Cheung as Grace Pak
Aaron Kwok as Bill Lee and Lee Rock's son. Ngan Tung's arresting officer in 1974.
Chingmy Yau as Rose
Ng Man-tat as Lardo
Paul Chun as Ngan Tung
Charles Heung as Sergeant Lam Kong
Michael Chan as King Crab
James Tien as Silverfish
Victor Hon as Hau
Louis Roth as Commissioner Alan
Wong Chi-keung as Detective Yeung
Peter Chan as Kirin / Fire Dragon
Jameson Lam as Rock's detective at station
Cheung Tat-ming as Ng Hak-ping
Hung Yan-yan as Shrimp Head / Lu
John Wakefield as Translator for Commissioner Alan
Dave Lam as Detective Tak
Wai Ching as Sergeant at meeting
Wong Siu-ming as Detective with gun at night club
Danny Chow as One of Shrimp Head's Men
Ridley Tsui as One of Shrimp Head's Men
Wong Chi-keung as thug beating molester
Ho Wing-cheung as thug beating molester
Michael Dinga as ICAC officer
Tam Wai-man as molester
Jim James as police officer
Lam Foo-wai as thug
Lau Chi-ming as Shrimp's thug at hospital
Tsim Siu-ling as Shrimp's thug at hospital
Huang Kai-sen as Shrimp's thug at hospital

Box office
The film grossed HK$23,135,334 during its theatrical run from 10 October to 20 November 1991 in Hong Kong.

See also
Andy Lau filmography
Aaron Kwok filmography
Wong Jing filmography

External links

Lee Rock II at Hong Kong Cinemagic

Lee Rock II film review at LoveHKFilm.com

1991 films
1991 crime drama films
Hong Kong crime drama films
Hong Kong action thriller films
Hong Kong sequel films
Police detective films
1990s Cantonese-language films
Golden Harvest films
Films set in 1959
Films set in the 1960s
Films set in 1972
Films set in 1974
Films set in Hong Kong
Films shot in Hong Kong
Films set in Canada
Films based on actual events
Films directed by Lawrence Ah Mon
1990s Hong Kong films